The Criminal Investigation Bureau (CIB) is the agency of National Police Agency under the Ministry of the Interior of the Republic of China.

History
The modern criminal police system of the Republic of China was originally established in 1946 when the National Police Department (NPD) was established under the jurisdiction of the Ministry of the Interior. It consisted of a Criminal Affairs Division and Crime Laboratory, as well as Criminal Sections for each province.

In 1945, Taiwan was handed over from Japan to the Republic of China. Soon afterwards, the Taiwan Provincial Police Administration (TPPA) was established under the jurisdiction of Taiwan Provincial Administration Office. TPPA consisted of an Investigation Unit under its First Section and a Forensic Science Unit under its Third Section. The two units were integrated with the Research Unit to form the Criminal Affairs Office. In 1946, NPD was upgraded to the National Police Service (NPS). On 16 May 1947, Taiwan Provincial Government was established and TPPA took over the task of police affairs in Taiwan. In 1949 after the government retreat from Nanking to Taipei, NPS was downgraded to NPD. On 15 July 1972, NPD was reorganized as the National Police Agency (NPA).

On 1 September 1973, the Criminal Investigation Bureau was established by the government and placed it under the jurisdiction of NPA. On 28 March 1974, CIB took over the duties of National Central Bureau Taipei (NCB Taipei) to liaise with Interpol. In 1998, the Taiwan Provincial Police Administration Criminal Police Corps was dissolved and its personnel and responsibilities were merged into CIB.

Organizational structure
 Commissioner
 Deputy Commissioners
 Crime Investigation Affairs Division
 Crime Prevention Affairs Division
 Anti-Organized Crime Division
 Legal Affairs Division
 Criminal Records Division
 International Criminal Affairs Divisions
 Cross-Strait Affairs Division
 Economic Crimes Division
 Forensic Examination Division
 Fingerprint Division
 Forensic Biology Division
 Research and Development Division
 Criminal Information Division
 Electronic Surveillance Division
 Crime Prevention and Detection Commanding Center
 Public Relations Office
 Secretarial Office
 Logistic Service Division
 Personnel Office
 Accounting Office
 Government Ethics Office
 Internal Affairs and Training Division
 1st Investigation Corp
 2nd Investigation Corp
 3rd Investigation Corp
 4th Investigation Corp
 5th Investigation Corp
 6th Investigation Corp
 7th Investigation Corp
 8th Investigation Corp
 9th Investigation Corp
 Telecommunications Investigation Corp
 Security Guard Unit

Commissioners
 Liu Po-liang
 Huang Ming-chao
 Huang Chia-lu

Transportation
The bureau is accessible within walking distance north west from Taipei City Hall Station of the Taipei Metro.

See also
 Ministry of the Interior (Taiwan)

References

External links

 

1973 establishments in Taiwan
Executive Yuan
Government agencies established in 1973
Law enforcement agencies of Taiwan